Juvasshytta is a mountain tourist station with restaurant and accommodation, located in Jotunheimen, in Lom municipality, Norway.

There is a public bus connection from Lom. Juvasshytta is used as a base station for walks to the summit of Galdhøpiggen, at  elevation, the highest mountain in Northern Europe. The area and the road is usually open from May to September, and closed the rest of the year.

Juvasshytta was originally built in 1884. The road was built in 1936.

About  from Juvasshytta, there is the Galdhøpiggen Summer Ski Centre, a small ski resort, which is open all summer. There is one ski lift and two pistes.

External links
Official site for Juvasshytta 
Official site for the Ski Centre 

Lom, Norway
Ski areas and resorts in Norway
Galdhøpiggen